The Committee on Economic and Monetary Affairs (ECON) is a committee of the European Parliament which is responsible for the regulation of financial services, the free movement of capital and payments, taxation and competition policies, oversight of the European Central Bank, and the international financial system.

Since the establishment of the Economic and Monetary Union (EMU), one of the most important function of this committee has been the oversight of the European Central Bank (ECB) through the "monetary dialogue". Although guaranteed independence under the Treaty, the ECB is accountable for its actions towards the European Parliament, and more precisely the ECON Committee. Every three months, the President of the ECB, or occasionally another member of the ECB's executive board, appears before the Committee to report on monetary policy and answer question from MEPs. These proceedings, usually called the "monetary dialogue", are webstreamed and a transcript is made available on both the Parliament and ECB websites.

The European Parliament's ECON Committee also plays an advisory role in the appointments of the President and board members of the ECB.

Ninth legislature

Members of the bureau

Eighth legislature

Members of the bureau

Seventh legislature

Members of the bureau

See also
 List of acronyms: European sovereign-debt crisis

References

Further reading 
  Pdf.
 
European Parliament (2014). "Monetary Dialogue 2009-2014: Looking Backward, Looking Forward."

External links
Official Homepage
Appointment of ECON Committee Chair and Vice-chairs in 2009
Members of the ECON Committee from the European Parliament ECON Committee website

Economic